Chlamys swifti, common name Swift's scallop, is a species of bivalve mollusc in the family Pectinidae.

Description
The shell is fan-shaped and it is composed of two valves, each of which is convex and has a few broad ribs. These radiate from the umbone, the rounded protuberance near the hinge. Beside the hinge are two irregular shell flaps or auricles with the anterior one normally being much larger than the other. This provides an attachment for the single strong adductor muscle that closes the shell. The background colour varies from pale brown to pale purple. These scallops can live up to 13 years. They are filter feeders, sieving microscopic algae from water that passes through its gills.

Distribution and habitat
This species is native to the southern coasts of the Sea of Japan, in Western Sakhalin, Hokkaido and Honshu Island. This low-boreal species lives attached by a byssus under rocks.

References
Biolib
Sandra E. Shumway,Jay G.J. Parsons Scallops: Biology, Ecology and Aquaculture: Biology, Ecology and Aquaculture
Ivin.narod.ru

Bivalves described in 1858
swifti